Economic Modelling is a monthly peer-reviewed academic journal on economics published by Elsevier. The editors-in-chief are Angus C. Chu (University of Macau) and Sushanta K. Mallick (Queen Mary University of London).

Abstracting and indexing 
The journal is abstracted and indexed by the Social Sciences Citation Index, Current Contents/Social and Behavioral Sciences, EconLit, International Bibliography of the Social Sciences, ProQuest, Research Papers in Economics, Scopus, and the Social Science Research Network. According to the Journal Citation Reports, the journal has a 2021 impact factor of 3.875.

References

External links 
 

English-language journals
Publications established in 1984
Economics journals
Elsevier academic journals
Bimonthly journals